The women's 10 metre platform competition at the 2015 European Games in Baku took place on 18 June at the Baku Aquatics Centre.

Results
The preliminary round was started at 13:20. The final was held at 20:30.

Green denotes finalists

References

Women's 10 metre platform